The Metolius River (pronounced muh TOLL ee us) is a tributary of the Deschutes River (through Lake Billy Chinook) in Central Oregon, United States, near the city of Sisters. The river flows north from springs near Black Butte, then turns sharply east, descending through a series of gorges before ending in the western end of the lake. The unincorporated community of Camp Sherman lies astride the southern end of the river. The name of the river comes from the Warm Springs or Sahaptin word mitula, meaning white salmon and referring to a light colored Chinook salmon and not a whitefish.

Headwaters

The headwaters of the river are at Metolius Springs, where the river emerges from two clusters of springs at the base of Black Butte. Water flows to these springs from the drainage basin around Black Butte Ranch, several miles to the south.

As a consequence, the water level in the Metolius River is relatively constant. Similarly, the water temperature is also stable; at the river source, the water temperature is a consistent .

General
The Metolius River flows  from Metolius Springs through the Deschutes National Forest, emptying into Lake Billy Chinook and ultimately the Deschutes River.  The upper  of the river are popular for catch-and-release fishing, whitewater rafting, picnicking, and camping. The lower  are on the boundary of the Warm Springs Indian Reservation, and flow by "a primitive area where motorized vehicles are not allowed."

The Metolius River was officially designated a National Wild and Scenic River in 1988.

Many of the summer homes along the Metolius River are constructed on United States Forest Service land, under provisions of a 1915 act of Congress, and are generally required to be set back from the river at least , allowing public access to the river.

Wildlife
The Metolius River supports a broad cross-section of the wildlife present in the Central Oregon region.  The river itself is home to several fish species, including rainbow trout, bull trout, kokanee salmon and mountain whitefish.  Larger animals including river otters and beaver inhabit the areas in and immediately around the river, and larger land mammals, including mule deer, elk, black bear, and cougar range in the surrounding area.  Migratory waterbirds such as the mallard and the Canada goose are common in the spring and summer, as are raptors such as the osprey and the red-tailed hawk.  The white-headed woodpecker, generally rare and of interest to many birders, is quite common in several areas along the river.

Recreation
Sport fishing for rainbow trout and bull trout is fly-fishing only on the upper Metolius—and catch-and-release, with barbless hooks. A number of small resorts and shops cater to fishermen and other visitors, principally in the community of Camp Sherman.

Hiking and horseback riding are popular activities in the area, particularly on the upper, southern portion of the river, with trails extending up and down the river and into the forests on both sides.  There are also a number of developed campgrounds on the banks of the river. Fishing, rafting, hunting and cross-country skiing are all popular seasonal activities.

This hatchery raises rainbow trout, kokanee, and salmon. The hatchery is open to visitors, with various species of trout and other fish on display in ponds.

Coordinates
Coordinates from GNIS list one point per 7.5 minute map.  The source and mouth are not repeated here.

See also
List of Oregon rivers
List of National Wild and Scenic Rivers
The National Forest Foundation's Conservation Plan for the Metolius River

References

External links

Upper Deschutes Watershed Council

Rivers of Oregon
Wild and Scenic Rivers of the United States
Rivers of Jefferson County, Oregon
Tributaries
Oregon placenames of Native American origin